Manganese(II) nitrate refers to the inorganic compounds with formula Mn(NO3)2·(H2O)n. These compounds are nitrate salts containing varying amounts of water. A common derivative is the tetrahydrate, Mn(NO3)2·4H2O, but mono- and hexahydrates are also known as well as the anhydrous compound.  Some of these compounds are useful precursors to the oxides of manganese.  Typical of a manganese(II) compound, it is a paramagnetic pale pink solid.

Structure
Manganese(II) compounds, especially with oxygenated ligands, are typically octahedral.  Following this trend, the tetrahydrate features four aquo ligands bound to Mn as well as two mutually cis, unidentate nitrate ligands. The hexaaquo salt features octahedral [Mn(H2O)6]2+.

Preparation, reactions, uses 
Manganese(II) nitrate is prepared from manganese dioxide and nitrogen dioxide:
MnO2  +  2 NO2   +  4H2O  →   Mn(H2O)4(NO3)2
Heating the tetrahydrate to 110 °C gives the pale yellow monohydrate.
The reaction is reversible in the sense that heating the dinitrate to 450°C gives a slightly nonstoichiometric dioxide.

Manganese(II) nitrate is the precursor to manganese(II) carbonate, which is used in fertilizers and as a colorant. The advantage of this method, use of ammonia and carbon dioxide, being that the side product ammonium nitrate is also useful as a fertilizer.

References 

Manganese(II) compounds
Nitrates